Four events were contested in archery at the 1988 Summer Olympics in Seoul.  These events included team competitions for the first time in modern Olympic archery.  Men's and women's individual competitions continued to be part of the schedule as well.

The format for the individual competition was altered for the first time since the 1972 Summer Olympics.  In Seoul, instead of all archers using the double FITA round to determine rankings, a sort of elimination plan was introduced.  Each archer shot a single FITA round to determine initial rankings.  Most archers were cut from the competition after this, with only 24 advancing.  These archers then shot one-fourth the number of arrows normal for a FITA round, with these scores being used to drop more archers.  This process was repeated until only 8 archers finished the fourth segment of the second round.

Competition format

Individual
84 archers competed in the men's individual competition while 62 competed in the women's event with a maximum of 3 athletes from each country in each event.  A preliminary ranking round was held where each archer shot a single FITA round. The top 24 ranked archers from the preliminary round advanced to eighth-final. In this round archers shot one-fourth the number of arrows normal for a FITA round with the top 18 advancing to the quarterfinals. The top 12 archers from the quarterfinals advanced to the semifinals where only the top 8 advanced to the final.

Team
Each country that had three archers in the individual competition may also compete in the team competition. In the first round the archers shot a single FITA round with the top 12 teams advancing to the semifinal. The top 8 teams from the semifinal advanced to the final.

Medal summary

Events

Medal table

Participating nations

References

External links
Official Olympic Report

 
1988 Summer Olympics events
1988
1988 in archery